Norbury and Roston is a civil parish in the Derbyshire Dales district of Derbyshire, England.  The parish contains nine listed buildings that are recorded in the National Heritage List for England.  Of these, two are listed at Grade I, the highest of the three grades, and the others are at Grade II, the lowest grade.  The parish contains the village of Norbury, the hamlet of Roston, and the surrounding countryside.  The listed buildings consist of a church and graves in the churchyard, a medieval hall house and an attached 17th-century country house, a former water mill and a drying kiln, a smaller house, and two bridges.


Key

Buildings

References

Citations

Sources

 

Lists of listed buildings in Derbyshire